Forest Mall was an enclosed shopping mall in Fond du Lac, Wisconsin, USA. Opened in 1973, the mall closed and was demolished in 2020.

History
Melvin Simon & Associates, now known as Simon Property Group, first announced plans for Forest Mall in 1964. The mall opened in September 1973, featuring Montgomery Ward, J. C. Penney, H. C. Prange Co., Prange Way and G. C. Murphy. A Copps Department Store was also located nearby. Of these stores, Montgomery Ward, J. C. Penney and Prange had relocated from downtown Fond du Lac. The Montgomery Ward space was later taken over by Kohl's, the Prange Way space by Sears and Prange's became Younkers.

Simon renovated the mall in 1998, adding skylights and new flooring. In 2006, several new stores opened at the mall, although most were local retailers.

In May 2014, JCPenney closed. It was the last of the original anchors in the mall. Sears closed on November 2, 2014, as did the Forest Mall Cinema. As a result, many retailers in the mall, local and national such as American Eagle, Aeropostale, Pac Sun, and Victorias Secret closed too.

In 2014, Simon Property Group spun off its underperforming malls, including Forest Mall, into an investment group known as WP Glimcher. In early 2016, Simon's investment group officially sold the mall to ATR Corinth Partners, a Dallas-based investment. Simon had developed the mall and owned it for more than 40 years.

Younkers closed in 2018.

By 2020, the mall had no internal tenants and was closed. Kohl's and Staples remained in operation, but had closed their mall entrances. In July 2020, demolition began. Staples closed too, and the mall and all anchors were demolished, with the exception of Kohl's, which remains open as a freestanding store. A Meijer store is set to be built on the site of the mall.

References

Shopping malls established in 1973
Shopping malls in Wisconsin
Fond du Lac, Wisconsin
Shopping malls disestablished in 2020
Defunct shopping malls in the United States
Demolished shopping malls in the United States
Buildings and structures demolished in 2020
1973 establishments in Wisconsin
2020 disestablishments in Wisconsin